Scorpaeninae is a subfamily of ray-finned fish belonging to the family Scorpaenidae in the order Scorpaeniformes, it includes the scorpionfishes, the lionfishes and turkeyfishes. They bear venomous spines in the anal, dorsal and pelvic fins which can cause severe pain in envenomated humans. The subfamily is distributed in the tropical and temperate seas around the world.

Genera
Scorpaeninae is divided into two tribes, the Scorpaenini, which contains 17 genera, and the Pteroini which contains 5 genera:

 Scorpaenini Risso, 1826
 Hipposcorpaena Fowler, 1938
 Hoplosebastes Schmidt, 1929
 Idiastion Eschmeyer, 1965
 Iracundus Jordan & Evermann, 1903
 Neomerinthe Fowler, 1935
 Neoscorpaena Mandrytsa, 2001
 Parascorpaena Bleeker, 1876
 Phenacoscorpius Fowler, 1938
 Pogonoscorpius Regan, 1908
 Pontinus Poey 1860
 Pteroidichthys Bleeker, 1856
 Rhinopias Gill, 1905
 Scorpaena Linnaeus, 1758
 Scorpaenodes Bleeker, 1857
 Scorpaenopsis Heckel 1837
 Sebastapistes Gill, 1877
 Taenianotus Lacépède, 1802
 Thysanichthys Jordan & Starks, 1904
 Ursinoscorpaenopsis Nakabo & Yamada, 1996
 Pteroini Kaup, 1873
 Brachypterois Fowler, 1938
 Dendrochirus Swainson, 1839
 Ebosia Jordan & Starks, 1904
 Parapterois Bleeker, 1876
 Pterois'' Oken, 1817

References

 
Scorpaenidae
Venomous fish
Taxa named by Antoine Risso
Ray-finned fish subfamilies